Zofia Kowalczyk (born 30 April 1929) is a Polish gymnast. She competed in seven events at the 1952 Summer Olympics.

References

1929 births
Living people
Polish female artistic gymnasts
Olympic gymnasts of Poland
Gymnasts at the 1952 Summer Olympics
Sportspeople from Kraków
20th-century Polish women